A glycophorin is a sialoglycoprotein of the membrane of a red blood cell.  It is a membrane-spanning protein and carries sugar molecules. It is heavily glycosylated (60%). Glycophorins are rich in sialic acid, which gives the red blood cells a very hydrophilic-charged coat. This enables them to circulate without adhering to other cells or vessel walls.

A particular mutation in Glycophorins is thought to produce a 40% reduction in risk of severe malaria.

Identification 

After separation of red cell membranes by SDS-polyacrylamide gel electrophoresis and staining with periodic acid-Schiff staining (PAS), four glycophorins have been identified. These have been named glycophorin A, B, C, and D in order of the quantity present in the membrane, gylycophorin A being the most and glycophorin D the least common. A fifth (glycophorin E) has been identified within the human genome but cannot easily be detected on routine gel staining. In total, the glycophorins constitute ~2% of the total erythrocyte membrane protein mass. These proteins are also known under different nomenclatures but they are probably best known as the glycophorins.

Family members 

The following four human genes encode glycophorin proteins:

 Glycophorin A
 Glycophorin B
 Glycophorin C
 Glycophorin E

Glycophorin D is now known to be a variant of Glycophorin C.

References

External links
 
 

Glycoproteins
Single-pass transmembrane proteins